Chullimada railway station (Code:CLMD) is a railway station in Palakkad District, Kerala and falls under the Palakkad railway division of the Southern Railway zone, Indian Railways.

References

Railway stations in Palakkad district
Palakkad railway division